Austro-Hungary's Luftfahrtruppen contained many aviators of Czech origin, i.e. ethnic Czechs and men born in the territory of the modern-day Czech Republic. The flying aces among them are listed below. At least one flier in the German Luftstreitkräfte was also of Czech origin.

See also
 List of World War I flying aces from Austria-Hungary
 List of World War I flying aces
 List of World War I flying aces from Austria
 List of World War I flying aces from Hungary
 List of World War I Slovakian flying aces

References

Further reading
 Franks, Norman; Guest, Russell; Alegi, Gregory (1997). Above the War Fronts: the British Two-seater Bomber Pilot and Observer Aces, the British Two-seater Fighter Observer Aces, and the Belgian, Italian, Austro-Hungarian and Russian Fighter Aces, 1914-1918: Volume 4 of Fighting Airmen of WWI Series: Volume 4 of Air Aces of WWI. Grub Street. , .

Czech
Lists of Czech military personnel
 List of World War I flying aces